The McDonnell XHCH (Model 86) was a 1950s aerial crane helicopter proposal for the United States Navy by the McDonnell Corporation.

Development
The XHCH was developed in the early 1950s to meet a US Navy requirement for a helicopter capable of carrying supplies and ammunition between ships and carrying heavy loads for short distances from ship-to-shore or from marshalling areas ashore to front-line units. Three prototypes (BuNos 138654/138656) were ordered, and a full-size mockup was inspected in May 1953. However, budget cuts forced the Navy to cancel the XHCH-1 project on January 18, 1959, without a prototype being built.

Specifications (XHCH estimated)

References

United States military helicopters
1950s United States helicopters
HCH
Tipjet-powered helicopters